The 1975 Brown Bears football team was an American football team that represented Brown University during the 1975 NCAA Division I football season. Brown finished second in the Ivy League. 

In their third season under head coach John Anderson, the Bears compiled a 6–2–1 record and outscored opponents 258 to 168. Kevin Slattery and Paul Serrano were the team captains. 

The Bears' 5–1–1 conference record placed second in the Ivy League standings, the team's best result since league play began in 1956. They outscored Ivy opponents 197 to 127. 

Brown played its home games at Brown Stadium in Providence, Rhode Island.

Schedule

References

Brown
Brown Bears football seasons
Brown Bears football